A World Not to Come: A History of Latino Writing and Print Culture is a 2013 history book by Raúl Coronado about the development of Latino identity through the use of writing and print culture in the 19th century.

Reception 

The book received seven book awards and two honorable mentions. It received awards from the Texas Institute of Letters, the National Association for Chicana and Chicano Studies, the Texas A&M University Melbern G. Glasscock Center for Humanities Research, the Modern Language Association, the Philosophical Society of Texas, the American Studies Association, and the Texas State Historical Association. It received honorable mentions from the Society for U.S. Intellectual History and the Western Literature Association. Beginning on May 15, 2015, the Society for U.S. Intellectual History held an online forum whereby three scholars reviewed the book followed by a response by the author.

Notes

References

External links 

 

2013 non-fiction books
Harvard University Press books
History books about the American Old West